Betty Low (1916 – March 12, 2016) was a Canadian ballet dancer and actress born in Ottawa, Ontario, who also performed under the stagename Ludmila Lvova. She is known primarily as a member of the Ballet Russe de Monte-Carlo,  and for her film and television acting career spanning several decades in the twentieth-century.

References 

1916 births
2016 deaths
Actresses from Ottawa
Canadian ballerinas
Canadian female dancers
Canadian emigrants to the United States
Canadian film actresses
Canadian television actresses
20th-century Canadian actresses
20th-century Canadian educators